Sarguja University (Sant Gahira Guru University) is a state university located in Ambikapur, Chhattisgarh, India. It is a teaching-cum-affiliating university which affiliates 75 college and has 7 departments and 1 constituent college. It was established and incorporated by Chhattisgarh Vishwavidyalaya Adhiniyam No. 18 of 2008 on September 2, 2008.  The University was established to serve the society through dissemination of knowledge in all the disciplines.

Academics
Arts, Humanities, and Social Sciences

Commerce

Computer Applications and IT

Education

Law

Management and Business Administration

Pharmacy

Sciences

Sarguja University offers various programs through its University Teaching Departments (U.T.D.)
Master of Science (Environmental Science)
Master of Arts (Functional Hindi)
Master of Science (Farm-Forestry)
Master of Science (Biotechnology)
LL.M. (Human Rights)
Diploma in Pharmacy

Departments
Department of Environmental Science
Department of Pharmacy
Department of Legal Studies
Department of Computer Science
Department of Farm-Forestry
Department of Functional Hindi
Department of Biotechnology

Affiliated colleges
The territorial jurisdiction of the University extends to the entire Sarguja division comprising 6 revenue districts: Balrampur, Jashpur, Koriya, Manendragarh-Chirmiri-Bharatpur district, Surajpur and Surguja .

Vishwavidyalaya Engineering College
Vishwavidyalaya Engineering College (VEC) is the only constituent college of Sarguja University. It was established in 2010 and has 4 departments that offer Bachelor of Engineering and Master of Technology courses.

References

External links

Educational institutions established in 2008
2008 establishments in Chhattisgarh
Universities in Chhattisgarh
Surguja district